Jiří Mareš (born 16 February 1992) is a Czech footballer who plays as a midfielder for Příbram in the Czech First League.

References

External links
 
 
 

1992 births
Living people
Czech footballers
Czech Republic youth international footballers
Czech Republic under-21 international footballers
Czech First League players
1. FK Příbram players
Association football midfielders